Otto Orseolo (also Urseolo; c. 992−1032) was the Doge of Venice from 1008 to 1026. He was the third son of Pietro II Orseolo and Maria Candiano, whom he succeeded at the age of sixteen, becoming the youngest doge in Venetian history.

Early life
When the Emperor Otto III sojourned in Verona and granted many privileges to Venice in the March of Verona, he requested Pietro to send his third son to Verona, where the Emperor acted as his sponsor at his confirmation. In the Emperor's honour, he was given the name Otto. In 1004, Pietro Otto, in the company of his eldest son and co-doge Giovanni, traveled to Constantinople, where Giovanni married the niece of Basil II, Maria Argyra, and Otto received several honorific titles.

After Giovanni's sudden death (1006), Pietro raised Otto to the dogeship with him. He then made a testament, giving the majority of his wealth to the poor and the Church, and retired to a monastery, leaving Otto the government. When Pietro finally died in 1008, he left Otto sole doge at the meager age of sixteen. Soon after the death of his father, in 1009, Otto married Grimelda, a daughter of the newly Christian Géza of Hungary and Adelaide. Because the Chronicon Venetum of John the Deacon ends in Otto's reign, it is necessary to rely on later chronicles. According to the chronicler (and doge) Andrea Dandolo, writing from a vantage point three centuries ahead, Otto was:

Reign and deposition (1008–1026)
Scandal marked much of Otto's reign, as he showed a clear inclination toward nepotism with the elevation of several relatives to positions of power. In 1017, Vitale Candiano, the Patriarch of Grado, died and Otto appointed his elder brother (Pietro's second son), Orso, already Bishop of Torcello, to the vacant patriarchate. Otto then filled the vacant Torcello with his younger brother Vitale. These actions lost him the support of the people, though they did not yet clamour for his removal from office. The denunciations of Poppo of Treffen, the Patriarch of Aquileia, incited the Venetians to expel Otto and the patriarch of Grado from Venice, whence they took refuge in Istria from 1022 to 1023. But in that latter year, Poppo sacked the patriarchal palace and church in Grado and the Venetians recalled Otto and Orso.

In 1024, Pope John XIX confirmed Orso's right to hold Grado and confirmed the patriarchal rights of his see vis-à-vis Aquileia. However, Otto continued to use church appointments to his own personal and familial advantage and the enemies of the Orseoli in Venice, with popular support, moved to depose him in 1026. They arrested him, shaved his beard, and banished him to Constantinople. There he was well received by Constantine VIII, the uncle of his sister-in-law, who repealed trade privileges previously granted to the Republic under Pietro II. Not for nothing had Otto built up a good rapport with the emperors of Europe: the Holy Roman Emperor Conrad II likewise revoked Venetian trade privileges in response to his deposition. Stephen I of Croatia, at the instigation of Otto's son Pietro, attacked the coastal cities of Dalmatia, capturing several from Venice.

Death in exile (1032)
Meanwhile, the Venetians had grown sick of Otto's successor, Pietro Barbolano, and they deposed him in turn (1032). Vitale of Torcello went to Constantinople to seek out his brother to reassume the ducal throne, while Orso of Grado took the government in his own hands in the interim. Vitale arrived in the Byzantine capital to find Otto on the verge of death and he died before he could return to Venice. Orso resigned the temporal power as soon as news reached Venice, while a relative, tried to usurp the throne. He failed and the Venetians turned to one Domenico Flabanico to be their doge.

Otto's son Pietro later succeeded Stephen as King of Hungary. Otto had two daughters, Frozza Orseolo and Felicia Orseolo. Felicia married to Nicolo Bembo, a member of the House of Bembo. Their daughter Elena Bembo married to Zuane Michiel, son of Vitale Michiel of the House of Michiel, and Felicia Elena Cornaro, member of the House of Cornaro. Their son Domenico Michiel became the 35th Doge of Venice.

Notes

Sources

Hazlitt, W. Carew. (1915). The Venetian Republic: Its Rise, its Growth, and its Fall. A.D. 409–1797. London: Adam and Charles Black. LOC DG676 .H43
McClellan, George B. (1904). The Oligarchy of Venice. Boston and New York: Houghton, Mifflin and Company. LOC DG677 .M13
Norwich, John Julius. (1982). A History of Venice. New York: Alfred A. Knopf.
Staley, Edgcumbe. (1910). The Dogaressas of Venice (The Wives of the Doges). London: T. W. Laurie.
 

11th-century Doges of Venice
990s births
1032 deaths
House of Orseolo